Klaus Beer (born 14 November 1942) is a former track and field athlete active in the 1960s for East Germany. Beer is best known for winning the silver medal in the long jump at the 1968 Summer Olympics, well behind Bob Beamon's record setting performance – Beamon jumped 8.90 m, while Beer jumped 8.19 m.

Biography
Beer was born in Liegnitz, Province of Lower Silesia, German Reich (today Legnica, Poland).

Beer won the silver medal in the long jump at the 1968 Summer Olympics, well behind Bob Beamon's record setting performance – Beamon jumped 8.90 m, while Beer jumped 8.19 m.

Beer was a seven time (1961, 1962, 1964, 1967–1970) East German champion competing outdoors and a national champion four times (1965, 1968–1970) indoors. He came in second at the European Indoor Athletics Championships in 1970. He also came in second at the 1970 European Cup Finals, Europe's team championship, which East Germany won that year.

He has coached Kofi Amoah Prah and Steffen Landgraf hope.

References

 

1942 births
Living people
People from Legnica
People from the Province of Lower Silesia
East German male long jumpers
Sportspeople from Lower Silesian Voivodeship
Olympic athletes of the United Team of Germany
Olympic athletes of East Germany
Athletes (track and field) at the 1964 Summer Olympics
Athletes (track and field) at the 1968 Summer Olympics
Olympic silver medalists for East Germany
Medalists at the 1968 Summer Olympics
Olympic silver medalists in athletics (track and field)
Recipients of the Patriotic Order of Merit in bronze